The 2022 Liga 3 Bengkulu is the fifth edition of Liga 3 Bengkulu organized by Asprov PSSI Bengkulu.

Followed by 19 clubs. The winner of this competition will immediately advance to the national round.

Benteng HB is the defending champion after winning it in the 2021 season.

Teams

Venues 
 Semarak Sawah Lebar Stadium, Bengkulu

First round

Group A

Group B

Group C

Group D

Second round 
Wait for the first round to finish.

References 

Seasons in Asian third tier association football leagues
Liga 3 (Indonesia) seasons